Skegss are an Australian surf and garage rock trio originally from Byron Bay, New South Wales. The band's line-up consists of Toby Cregan (bass, vocals, guitar), Jonny Lani (drums) and Ben Reed (vocals, guitar, bass).

They have released several extended plays and toured both nationwide and internationally. Skegss made international headlines after accusing American rappers Reese and Lil Yachty of copying the cover art for that collaboration's single, "Do It", from the band's 2015 EP, 50 Push Ups for a Dollar.

Their debut studio album, My Own Mess, was released in September 2018 and peaked at number 2 on the ARIA Album Charts. In October 2020 the group re-released 50 Push Ups for a Dollar on vinyl, which reached number 4. They followed with a double EP as a vinyl compilation album, Holiday Food/Everyone Is Good at Something, re-released in November 2020, which reached number 17.

Career

2014–2017: Formation and early EPs
Skegss were formed in Byron Bay in 2014 as a surf music and garage rock quartet by Toby Cregan ( Toby Two String) on bass guitar, Noa Deane on guitar, Jonny Lani ( Johnny Layback) on drums and Ben Reed ( Ben Ben Bograil) on lead vocals and guitar. Lani and Reed were childhood friends and reconnected in 2014, the pair began "playing shows for a hundred bucks and a couple of beers wherever [they] could."

Their debut single, "L.S.D." was released in July 2014, at which time they were described by Stab Magazines writer as, "A band without complex. It's just as you hear, a slack rock band, that remind you of walking bare feet, being sunburned with stiff hair thanks to sea salt." Cregan explained the track's title, "The song is called 'L.S.D' but not like acid, more like, Live.Sleep.Die." They followed with a set of performances in Sydney and southern Queensland in August. Chris Singh of AU.Review opined fans could expect, "a sound which is deceptively casual; a well-crafted ode to those with a more laid-back approach to life."

Their second single, "Rock 'n' Roll Radio", was released in October 2014, which Singh's associate Paul McBride observed, "shows you how easy it is to make a simple and laid-back rock and roll track." By April 2015 Deane had left Skegss to concentrate on his surfing career. The group continued as a trio. They commenced a tour of North America at the end of that month taking dates in California, New York City and Toronto.

Upon return to Australia, in June 2015, they were signed with Ratbag Records, run by Brisbane-based surf musicians, Dune Rats, and distributed by Warner Music. Skegss first EP for the Ratbag label, 50 Push Ups for a Dollar, appeared in October 2015, with a track, "Fun", issued as a single in July.

Skegss' next EP, Everyone Is Good at Something, with seven tracks was released in July 2016. It peaked at No. 4 on the ARIA Hitseekers Albums Chart. James Tait of Howl and Echoes felt, "they look to push their career to further heights with the release of their sophomore EP... [they] happen to be fantastically talented at making punk rock: three honest chords on sun-bleached guitars, chugging rhythms and lyrics reflecting both the debauchery and uncertainty of themselves and the young crowds they manage to wow over on an almost nightly basis."

Kill Your Stereos Peyton Bernhardt rated it at 75 out-of 100 and explained, "[it] plays out as an existential crisis that an indie rock aficionado may have amid a quintessentially Australian social setting... [they] are the Pharrell Williams of Aussie beach-rock, spreading the happiness around like a contagious virus that you'd be goddamn lucky to catch."

The group issued their next single, "Spring Has Sprung", in December 2016, which theMusic.com.aus staff writer opined, "[it] is everything you could want from a raw, DIY punk anthem, with angst-fuelled sing-alongs imminent as we approach festival season." They followed with another five-track EP, Holiday Food, in April 2017. The group combined both recent EPs as Holiday Food/Everyone Is Good at Something and issued it as a compilation double EP in the same month. It reached the ARIA Hitseekers Albums Chart at No. 12.

Its lead single, "Got on My Skateboard", was issued a month earlier, with Andrew Massie of The Rockpit, expressing the view, "Wrapped in driving drums with an instantly memorable hook that'll earworm you for days, [it] bleeds nostalgia of years gone by and the notion that you should take advantage of being young to make sure you don't ever regret things you didn't do, rather than those that you did." They undertook a headlining tour, in June, to promote the album's release. "Got on My Skateboard" was listed at No. 39 on the Triple J Hottest 100, 2017.

2018–present: My Own Mess and Rehearsal
In September 2018, the band released their debut studio album My Own Mess, which peaked at number 2 on the ARIA charts. At the ARIA Music Awards of 2019, My Own Mess was nominated for ARIA Award for Best Rock Album, losing out to Amyl and the Sniffers by Amyl and the Sniffers.

In late 2020, Skegss re-released early EPs on vinyl for the first time, starting with 50 Push Ups for a Dollar in October and the double EP Holiday Food / Everyone Is Good at Something in November. Both debuted and peaked within the ARIA top 20.

On 16 September 2020, the band released the single "Fantasising". Following its release, Skegss were accused of music plagiarism, with various commentators likening the guitar riffs in the song to "By the Way" by Adelaide punk rock duo Teenage Joans. Skegss later apologised to the duo and called the similarities unintentional.

On 26 March 2021, Skegss released their second studio album, Rehearsal which had been preceded by five singles. The album peaked at number 1 on the ARIA Charts.

Band members
Current members
 Ben Reed – lead and backing vocals, guitar, bass guitar (2014–present)
 Jonny Lani – drums (2014–present)
 Toby Cregan – bass guitar, backing and lead vocals, guitar (2014–present)

Past members
 Noa Deane – guitar (2014–2015)

Public image
In an interview with Skegss, David James Young of Mixdown Magazine said the band "come across as standard loose-unit garage rockers with thrashing manes." Life Without Andy said the band has a "youthful energy and [an] infectious sense of humour". Time Out described the band as "DIY, beer-drinking and self-producing maniacs from the surf coast", whilst James Tait of Howl and Echoes has described them as "just three fun-loving dudes from Byron Bay who enjoy a cold beer."

Discography

Studio albums

Compilation albums

Extended plays

Footnotes

Singles

Awards

ARIA Music Awards
The ARIA Music Awards is an annual awards ceremony that recognises excellence, innovation, and achievement across all genres of Australian music. Skegss have received one nomination.

! 
|-
| 2019  
| My Own Mess 
| Best Rock Album 
| 
|
|-
| 2021  
| Chris Collins for Rehearsal by Skegss
| Engineer of the Year 
| 
|

Rolling Stone Australia Awards
The Rolling Stone Australia Awards are awarded annually in January or February by the Australian edition of Rolling Stone magazine for outstanding contributions to popular culture in the previous year.

! 
|-
| 2022
| Rehearsal
| Best Record
| 
| 
|-

References

2011 establishments in Australia
Australian punk rock groups
Australian surf rock groups
Musical groups established in 2011
New South Wales musical groups
Byron Bay, New South Wales